Nagyrév is a village in Jasz-Nagykun-Szolnok, central Hungary.  It was the location of the Nagyrév culture.

Between 1914 and 1929, a large group of female villagers calling themselves "the Angel Makers of Nagyrév" systematically poisoned to death an estimated forty people.

External links
  (in Hungarian)

Populated places in Jász-Nagykun-Szolnok County